The WWE Performance Center is the official professional wrestling school system of the American professional wrestling promotion WWE. The promotion currently operates two Performance Center locations, which serve as training facilities for WWE wrestlers, as well as sports science and medical facilities. The first branch, located in Orlando, Florida, was opened on July 11, 2013. The second branch opened on January 11, 2019, in Enfield, London.

During the early stages of the COVID-19 pandemic, the main studio of the Performance Center in Orlando became WWE's home arena, with the company moving its weekly television programs and all pay-per-views for Raw and SmackDown (including WrestleMania 36) behind closed doors at a studio in the facility from March 2020 onward. In August 2020, WWE moved its closed productions to larger, arena settings as the WWE ThunderDome—which used a larger-scale production more in line with its touring shows, and a virtual audience.

NXT and 205 Live subsequently moved to the Performance Center in October 2020, with NXT moving from its former home at Full Sail University, and its main arena being reconfigured as the "Capitol Wrestling Center" (CWC) to suit the look and feel of NXT programming. Unlike Raw and SmackDown's tenure at the Performance Center, NXT's move was permanent, and most of its remaining COVID-19 restrictions were lifted in June 2021. The CWC naming was dropped in September 2021 as part of a larger relaunch of NXT, which saw a second reconfiguration of the arena.

History

Training facilities
The facility was opened in 2013 and replaced the training center at WWE's former developmental territory, Florida Championship Wrestling (FCW), which was based in Tampa and had been serving as WWE's developmental headquarters since 2008.

The Performance Center trains around 65 to 70 wrestlers at any one time. Trainees have a variety of experience levels, from beginners from non-wrestling backgrounds to experienced wrestlers from the independent circuit. Wrestlers train to improve their in-ring performance, strength and conditioning, as well as working on their characters and personality. Upcoming referees, ring announcers, commentators, and backstage interviewers also train at the Performance Center. The trainees train full-time, while also performing at weekly NXT house shows and appearing on NXT television. In addition, established WWE performers often use the facility for training and injury rehab while mentoring new trainees.

The Performance Center uses former wrestlers as trainers. The inaugural head trainer was Bill DeMott, who departed the company in 2015 and was replaced by Matt Bloom. Other trainers include Sara Amato, Robbie Brookside, Norman Smiley, Adam Pearce, Mike Quackenbush, Scotty 2 Hotty and Sarah Stock. Dusty Rhodes was responsible for developing the trainees' microphone skills and wrestling personas until his death in 2015. The Performance Center includes some guest trainers, including Kevin Nash and Scott Hall.

In addition to training contracted performers, the Performance Center is also regularly used for tryouts which operate on an invite-only basis and include athletes from a wide variety of backgrounds, including established domestic and international professional wrestlers, amateur wrestlers, NFL and NCAA American football players, and individuals from a range of other sporting and non-sporting backgrounds.

A second Britain-based Performance Center opened in Enfield, London on January 11, 2019. In April 2019, WWE announced plans to open additional Performance Centers in India and China.

Use as a home arena 

On March 12, 2020, WWE announced that due to the COVID-19 pandemic (which resulted in the suspension of many professional sports leagues), live episodes of Raw and SmackDown would air from the Performance Center without an audience until further notice, beginning with the following day's episode of SmackDown. The company had begun filming episodes of NXT without an audience at Full Sail University the previous day, although the March 11 episode was filmed at the Performance Center and was the last show produced with a live paying audience. On March 16, it was announced that WrestleMania 36, set to take place on April 5 and previously scheduled for Raymond James Stadium in Tampa, Florida, would instead be moved to the Performance Center, again without an audience and would expand to two nights taking place on Saturday April 4 and Sunday April 5. 

The Performance Center continued to host episodes of Raw, SmackDown, 205 Live, and Main Event, as well as the pay-per-views Money in the Bank, Backlash, and The Horror Show at Extreme Rules, before the shows and pay-per-views moved to the new, larger-scale "ThunderDome" staging (under similar restrictions, but with a virtual audience on LED screens) at Orlando's Amway Center, beginning with the August 21 SmackDown and that weekend's SummerSlam. In December, the ThunderDome relocated to Tropicana Field in St. Petersburg, Florida before moving to Yuengling Center in Tampa in April 2021, and being discontinued entirely in July 2021 with the resumption of touring shows.

NXT moves to the Performance Center
In October 2020, beginning with NXT TakeOver 31, NXT and 205 Live moved to the Performance Center (from Full Sail University and the ThunderDome at Amway Center, respectively, as 205 Live was being subsumed by NXT), using a reconfigured version of the facility's main arena branded as the "Capitol Wrestling Center"—an homage to WWE's precursor, the Capitol Wrestling Corporation. It was designed to reflect the look and feel of NXT programming, with a virtual audience similar to the ThunderDome on an LED screen in the studio, and areas for limited outside spectators divided by plexiglass walls decorated with chain-link fencing.

For TakeOver: Stand & Deliver in April 2021, the plexiglass wall dividers were removed and live audience capacity was increased. TakeOver: In Your House in June lifted almost all COVID-19 protocols, including mask requirements and the virtual audience, and expanded its seating capacity to around 300, Those who had tested positive for COVID-19 within the past 14 days were asked not to attend. While Raw and SmackDown resumed a live touring schedule in mid-July, NXT's move to the Performance Center was permanent. On September 14, 2021, the arena received a new stage design with the relaunch of NXT as NXT 2.0; the Capitol Wrestling Center name was dropped at this time.

Events hosted
The following are the events that have been held at the Performance Center while being used as a home arena:

Locations

United States
The first WWE Performance Center facility was opened on July 11, 2013. The Performance Center replaced the training center at WWE's former developmental territory, Florida Championship Wrestling (FCW), which was based in Tampa and had been serving as WWE's developmental headquarters since 2008.

Wrestlers trained

2013

2014

2015

2016

2017

2018

2019

2020

2021

2022

2023

United Kingdom
The British branch was located at the Great Cambridge Industrial Estate in Enfield, London and was opened on January 11, 2019. The center was 17,000 square feet and included 2 rings.

Wrestlers trained

2019

2020

2021

2015 shooting incident
In August 2015, Orange County Sheriff's Office deputies shot 29-year-old Armando Montalvo outside the Performance Center after he threatened them and charged at them. Montalvo was "obsessed" with female wrestler AJ Lee and made numerous attempts to trespass through the facility, despite an injunction against him by WWE. Days after the shooting, Montalvo claimed he was bipolar when he was questioned by detectives. He faced trial in February 2016 on charges of aggravated assault, resisting an officer with violence, and trespassing. A public defender representing Montalvo has entered a written plea of not guilty on his behalf.

On April 19, 2018, WWE filed an emergency restraining order against Montalvo after he returned to the Performance Center the previous month and harassed the employees. In addition, Montalvo posted a threatening message to WWE wrestlers and staff on his Instagram account. On May 7, 2018, Montalvo was arrested for missing his court date with WWE.

See also
 Full Sail University
 WCW Power Plant
 WWE Tough Enough

References

External links
 

Performance center
Performance center
Professional wrestling schools
Schools in Orlando, Florida
Professional wrestling in Orlando, Florida
Education in the London Borough of Enfield
Professional wrestling in England
Performance center
2013 establishments in Florida
2019 establishments in England